Artur Paredes (10 May 1899 – 20 December 1980) was a Portuguese guitar player in the city of Coimbra. He was the natural son of Gonçalo Rodrigues Paredes and Maria do Céu.

Much of today's Coimbra guitar features can be traced back to his contact with local luthiers. His son Carlos Paredes was a virtuoso and attained popularity, becoming the most internationally known Portuguese guitar player. He entered into the dominion of classical music with his compositions for the Portuguese guitar, beyond the traditional use of the instrument in fado musicianship.

References

1899 births
1980 deaths
People from Coimbra
Portuguese classical guitarists
Portuguese fado guitarists
Male guitarists
20th-century guitarists
20th-century male musicians
20th-century classical musicians